Acanthoponera is a Neotropical genus of ants in the subfamily Ectatomminae Acanthoponera contains six (one is indeterminate, and one is a morphotaxon) rarely collected species and a fifth unnamed species mentioned by Brown (1958) only known from a stray gyne.

Acanthoponera is a genus of ants from the New World, distributed from Mexico to Argentina (approximately). Specimens have been observed in wooded areas.

Identification 
medium size in workers (5-10mm) pale yellow color in its majority, large convex eyes and shallow antennal brooms. The propodeum bears a pair of teeth or spines (long and slender in worker), and the apex of the petiole node occurs dorsocaudally as a thin subconical spine with a more or less sharp point. The tarsal claws are very well developed and each bears not only a strong submedian tooth, but also a prominent narrow lobe resembling a third tooth.

• Count of antennal segments: 12 • Antennal club: 4-5 • Palp formula: 6.4 • Total tooth count: 6-9

Species
 Acanthoponera goeldii Forel, 1912
 Acanthoponera minor (Forel, 1899)
 Acanthoponera mucronata (Roger, 1860)
 Acanthoponera peruviana Brown, 1958

References

External links

How To Get Rid Of Argentine Ants

Heteroponerinae
Ant genera